This is a list of anime industry companies involved in the production or distribution of anime.

Japan-based companies

Animation studios 
There are over 500 animation studios in Japan. Below are those notable enough to have an article.
3Hz
A.C.G.T
 A.P.P.P.
Actas
 Ajia-do Animation Works
 Anime International Company (AIC)
 Arms Corporation (defunct)
 Artland
Artmic (defunct)
Arvo Animation
Nippon Rois Cartoon (Regional Service Division for Japan from Indonesia)
Ashi Productions
 Asahi Production
 Asread
AXsiZ
 Bandai Namco Pictures
 Bee Train
Bibury Animation Studios
Blue Lynx
 Bones
 Brain's Base
Bridge (studio)
 C2C
Chaos Project
 CoMix Wave Films
Connect (studio) (defunct, absorbed by Silver Link and then dissolved)
 Creators in Pack
 C-Station
CygamesPictures
 Daume
 David Production
 Diomedéa
 DLE
 Doga Kobo
 ENGI
 EMT Squared
 Eight Bit 
 Eiken
Ekachi Epilka
EMT Squared
Encourage Films
Ezo'la
 Fanworks
 Feel
Felix Film
Gaina (company)
 Gainax
 Gallop
Geno Studio
Geek Toys
 GEMBA (studio)
 GoHands
 Gonzo
Graphinica
Grizzly (studio)
 Group TAC
 Yumeta Company (formerly known as TYO Animations.)
 Hal Film Maker (defunct/absorbed into Yumeta Company after merger of previous Yumeta and Hal into TYO Animations.)
 Hoods Entertainment
 Imagin
 J.C.Staff
 Khara
Kinema Citrus
Kitayama Eiga Seisakujo (defunct)
 Kitty Films
Kokusai Eiga-sha (defunct)
 Kyoto Animation
Lapin Track
Larx Entertainment
Lay-duce
 Lerche
 Liden Films
 Madhouse
 Magic Bus
 Maho Film
 Manglobe (defunct)
Marza Animation Planet
 MAPPA
Millepensee
 Mook Animation
 Mushi Production
 NAZ (studio)
 Nexus
 Nippon Animation
 Nomad
NUT (studio)
Oh! Production
 OLM
 Orange
 Ordet
 P.A. Works
Palm Studio (defunct)
 Passione
 Pierrot
 Pine Jam
Platinum Vision
 Polygon Pictures
 Production I.G
Production IMS (defunct)
Project No.9
 Radix Ace Entertainment (defunct)
Remic
 Revoroot
Robot Communications
 Satelight
 Sanzigen
 Science SARU
 Shaft
Shin-Ei Animation
Shirogumi
Shuka (studio)
 Seven
 Seven Arcs
 Sony, through Aniplex
 A-1 Pictures
 CloverWorks
Spectrum Animation (defunct)
Signal.MD
 Silver Link
 Square Enix Image Studio Division
 Studio 4°C
Studio A-Cat
Studio Bind
 Studio Blanc
 Studio Chizu
 Studio Colorido
 Studio Comet
 Studio Deen
 Studio Fantasia
 Studio Ghibli
 Studio Gokumi
 Studio Hibari
 Studio Kai
 Studio Nue
 Studio Orphee
 Studio Ponoc
 Studio Puyukai
 Studio VOLN
 Sunrise
 SynergySP
 Tatsunoko Production
Tear Studio (defunct)
 Tezuka Productions
 TMS Entertainment (formerly Tokyo Movie Shinsha)
 Telecom Animation Film
Tengu Kobou
 TNK
Tsuchida Production (defunct)
 Toei Animation
 Topcraft (defunct)
Typhoon Graphics
 Triangle Staff (defunct)
Troyca
 Trigger
 Ufotable
 White Fox
 Wit Studio
 Xebec (defunct, mostly sold to Sunrise)
Yaoyorozu (defunct)
Yokohama Animation Laboratory
 Zexcs
 Zero-G
Studio Ponoc

Producers 
 Animax
 Avex
 Bandai Visual
 BROCCOLI
 Dentsu
Genco
 Geneon Universal Entertainment (Geneon USA, formerly Pioneer LDC, now NBCUniversal Entertainment Japan)
 Good Smile Company
 Hakuhodo DY Media Partners
 J-List
 Japan Home Video
 Kadokawa Shoten
 King Records / Starchild
 KSS
Mag Garden
NBCUniversal Entertainment Japan
Warner Bros. Japan
 Nihon Ad Systems
 Nintendo
 Pony Canyon
 Shinca Entertainment
 Soft On Demand
 Sony
 Sony Music Entertainment Japan
 Aniplex
 Square Enix
Shochiku
 The Pokémon Company (Nintendo owns 32%.)
 Toho
 VAP
 Victor Entertainment
Youmex (defunct)
 Nippon Rois Cartoon (Regional Service Division for Japan from Indonesia)

Non-Japanese companies

Distributors

North America and other regions 
 Amazon Inc. (International)
 Prime Video (International) 
 AMC Networks
 Sentai Filmworks (U.S.)
 HIDIVE (U.S.)
 Animation International
 AnimEigo (U.S.)
 Anime Matsuri (U.S.)
 Digital Media Rights (U.S.)
 RetroCrush (U.S.)
 Discotek Media (U.S.)
 Disney (U.S.)
 Hulu (U.S.; fully controlled and majority-owned by)
 Eleven Arts (U.S., movies only) 
 Entertainment One (U.S., includes properties acquired by parent Hasbro from its purchase of Saban Brands)
 Fakku (U.S.)
 GKIDS (U.S., movies only)
 Konami Cross Media NY (U.S.) (formerly known as 4Kids Productions and 4K Media Inc.; 4Kids Productions shut down in 2012 by 4Kids Entertainment, acquired by Konami and rebranded as 4K Media from 2012-2019).
 Miramax (U.S., previously owned by Disney until 2010 when it was acquired by Filmyard Holdings)
 US Manga Corps
 Media Blasters (U.S.)
 Netflix (International)
 NIS America (U.S., American subsidiary of Nippon Ichi Software )
 Ponycan USA (U.S., American subsidiary of Pony Canyon)
 Shinca Entertainment (U.S.)
 Shout! Factory (U.S.)
 Sony (International)
 Aniplex of America (U.S., American subsidiary of Aniplex owned by Sony Music Entertainment Japan)
 Sony Pictures Television International/Sony Pictures Home Entertainment (International)
 Funimation (U.S.)
 Crunchyroll (U.S.)
 Right Stuf Inc. (U.S., main distribution subdivision is "Nozomi Entertainment" as of 2007)
 Viz Media (U.S., owned jointly by Shogakukan and Shueisha of Japan, run independently)
 Warner Bros. Discovery (U.S.)
 Warner Bros. Television (U.S.)

South America 
Editorial Ivrea (Argentina)
JBC (Brazil)
Panini Group (Brazil and Argentina)

Europe-exclusive 
 Anime Limited (United Kingdom, France and Ireland)
 Dynit (Italy, Switzerland)
 MVM Films (UK)
 Universum Film GmbH (Germany)
 Sony (International), through Crunchyroll
 Crunchyroll EMEA (France, Germany, Switzerland, United Kingdom)
 Manga Entertainment UK (the main branch of "Manga Entertainment")
 Animatsu Entertainment (United Kingdom, merged into Manga Entertainment UK)
 StudioCanal UK (UK)
 Universal Pictures (UK, Ireland)

Southeast Asia, South Asia, and East Asia 
 Animation International (Hong Kong)
 Aniplus (South Korea, Singapore)
 Bilibili (China)
 CBI Pictures (Indonesia)
 PT ROIS CARTOON STUDIO (Indonesia)
 JY Animation (China)
 Medialink (Hong Kong)
 Mighty Media (Taiwan)
 Muse Communication (Taiwan)
Odex (Singapore)
KC Global Media Entertainment LLC (Singapore)
 T&M Media (Taiwan)
 Telesuccess Productions (Philippines)

Australia 
 Hanabee Entertainment
 Sony (International), through Crunchyroll
 Madman Anime

Defunct 
 ADV Films (U.S., U.K.) (shut down in 2009, selling off its assets and intellectual properties to four other Houston-based companies, such as Section23 Films)
 AN Entertainment (U.S., division of AnimeNation, no new releases since 2007. Retail operations of parent company ceased in 2014.)
 Bandai Entertainment (U.S., owned by Bandai Namco Entertainment)
 Bandai Visual USA (U.S., previously a subsidiary of Bandai Visual Japan and not affiliated with Bandai Entertainment, now folded into Bandai Entertainment)
 Beez Entertainment (EU, owned by Bandai)
 Central Park Media (de facto defunct since mid-2007 when new DVD releases ceased; although they continued to license their titles for TV and VOD, they entered a state of limbo. Officially declared bankruptcy and assets liquidated in mid-2009. Several of their titles have been acquired by other anime distributing companies prior to and following Central Park Media's bankruptcy and liquidation, such as ADV Films, Bandai Entertainment, Funimation Entertainment, Media Blasters, Nozomi Entertainment, etc.)
 US Manga Corps (U.S., part of Central Park Media)
 Anime 18 (U.S., part of Central Park Media)
 Software Sculptors (U.S., part of Central Park Media)
 Family Home Entertainment (U.S., renamed Artisan Entertainment) in the 1990s, then acquired by Lions Gate Entertainment in 2003)
 Frontier Enterprises (Japan)
 Geneon Entertainment (U.S. branch "Geneon USA" (formerly "Pioneer Entertainment"), defunct September 2007. Parent Japanese company ceased in-house distribution of its own titles, many of which have been re-licensed by Funimation and Sentai Filmworks. Parent company "Geneon Entertainment" then sold off its own ownership to NBCUniversal subsidiary UPI, which then merged Geneon with its own "Universal Pictures Japan" division on February 1, 2009, renaming the new company "Geneon Universal Entertainment Japan").
 Go Fish Pictures (U.S. subsidiary of DreamWorks)
 Illumitoon Entertainment (U.S., de facto defunct since late-2007 when new DVD releases were cancelled)
 Kadokawa Pictures USA (U.S., American subsidiary of Kadokawa Pictures)
 Manga Entertainment (UK, U.S.: Established as L.A. Hero in 1990, brought by Island World Communications in late 1994 and renamed Manga Entertainment in 1995, bought by Anchor Bay Entertainment in 2005, later bought by Lionsgate in 2016)
 NuTech Digital (U.S.)
 Ponimu (Indonesia)
 Saban Entertainment (U.S., acquisitions either went to The Walt Disney Company or just expired, succeeded by Saban Brands)
 Saban Brands (U.S., shuttered in 2018 after selling entertainment properties to Hasbro)
 Siren Visual (Australia)
 Streamline Pictures (U.S., Canada; stopped producing new anime releases in 1996, folding into Orion Pictures, which in turn folded into Metro-Goldwyn-Mayer one year later, in 1997.  The Streamline brand name officially went defunct in 2002.)
 Synch-Point (U.S., a subsidiary of Broccoli, defunct when parent company Broccoli International USA shut down their operations in 2007)
 U.S. Renditions (U.S., a subsidiary of Books Nippan, defunct mid-1990s)
 Urban Vision (U.S.)
 Tokyopop (U.S.)

Producers 
 Harmony Gold USA (U.S.)
 Sav! The World Productions (FRA)
 World Events Productions (U.S.)
 Nelvana (Canada)
 PT ROIS CARTOON STUDIO (Indonesia)

References 

 
Anime